Per Eugen Kristiansen (born 8 April 1969) is a Norwegian sailor from Bekkestua who won a bronze medal at the 2012 Summer Paralympics in the Sonar class, together with Marie Solberg and Aleksander Wang-Hansen. He has sailed since he was 7. In 1994, he was involved in a climbing accident, and since then has been reliant on a wheelchair. Nine months later, he was an active sailor again. In 1998, he competed for the first time after a disabled sailor invited him to an event, and from then on, he has been an active regatta sailor. In January 2012, he won the World Sailing Championship in Florida.

In 1993, Kristiansen got his cand.scient. in organic chemistry from the University of Oslo. On 22 October 1999, he received his doctorate, and from 2000 to 2002, he undertook postdoctorate studies at Washington State University. From 2002 to 2005, he worked at the University of Oslo, where he is now a senior engineer in the department for biochemistry and molecular biology.

References

External links 
 Homepage at the Institute for Molecular Biological Science
 Picture of bronze boat at eurosport.yahoo.com

21st-century Norwegian scientists
Norwegian male sailors (sport)
Norwegian disabled sportspeople
Sportspeople from Bærum
1969 births
University of Oslo alumni
Washington State University alumni
Academic staff of the University of Oslo
Living people
Norwegian expatriates in the United States
Scientists with disabilities